Houndsharks, the Triakidae, are a family of ground sharks, consisting of about 40 species in nine genera. In some classifications, the family is split into two subfamilies, with Mustelus, Scylliogaleus, and Triakis in the subfamily Triakinae, and the remaining genera in the subfamily Galeorhininae.

Houndsharks are distinguished by possessing two large, spineless dorsal fins, an anal fin, and oval eyes with nictitating eyelids. They are found throughout the world in warm and temperate waters, where they feed on fish and invertebrates on the seabed and in midwater.

Genera
 Furgaleus Whitley, 1951 (whiskery shark)
 Galeorhinus Blainville, 1816 (school shark)
 Gogolia Compagno, 1973 (sailback houndshark)
 Hemitriakis Herre, 1923
 Hypogaleus J. L. B. Smith, 1957 (blacktip tope)
 Iago Compagno & Springer, 1971
 Mustelus H. F. Linck, 1790 (smooth-hound)
 Scylliogaleus Boulenger, 1902
 Triakis J. P. Müller & Henle, 1839

See also

List of sharks

References

 
 Cladogram reference

Triakidae
Extant Paleocene first appearances
Taxa named by John Edward Gray